is a town located in Iyo District, Ehime Prefecture, Japan. It is the smallest municipality in terms of area in Ehime Prefecture.

Geography 
Masaki faces the Seto Inland Sea, and is located at the southern end of the Dogo Plain in the northwestern part of the island of Shikoku. It is the only municipality in Ehime Prefecture that does not have any mountains. The town area is longer in the east-west direction than in the north-south direction.

Surrounding municipalities 
Ehime Prefecture
 Matsuyama
 Iyo
 Tobe

Climate
Masaki has a Humid subtropical climate (Köppen Cfa) characterized by warm summers and cool winters with light snowfall.  The average annual temperature in Masaki is 15.2 °C. The average annual rainfall is 1777 mm with September as the wettest month. The temperatures are highest on average in January, at around 26.1 °C, and lowest in January, at around 4.5 °C.

Demographics
Per Japanese census data, the population of Masaki has been generally increasing since the 1960s.

History 
The area of Masaki was par of ancient Iyo province. Masaki was developed as a castle town by Kato Yoshiaki in the late Sengoku period; however, when he relocated to Matsuyama Castle, and of the merchants and artisans relocated with him. in the Edo Period, most of the area wash part of Matsuyama Domain with a smaller portion under the control of Ōzu Domain. The village of Masaki was established on December 15, 1889 with the creation of the modern municipalities system. It was elevated to town status on October 31, 1922. Masaki annexed neighboring Okada and Kita-Iyo villages on March 31, 1955.

Government
Masaki has a mayor-council form of government with a directly elected mayor and a unicameral town council of 14 members. Masaki, together with the city of Tobe, contributes two members to the Ehime Prefectural Assembly. In terms of national politics, the town is part of Ehime 2nd district of the lower house of the Diet of Japan.

Economy
Masaki is an industrial center for the production of textiles and synthetic fibers. Food processing is also a component of the local economy. The area was traditionally dependent on commercial fishing and on agriculture, and is increasingly becoming a commuter town for neighboring Matsuyama.

Education
Masaki has three public elementary schools and three public middle school operated by the town government, and one public high school operated by the Ehime Prefectural Board of Education.

Transportation

Railways 
 Shikoku Railway Company - Yosan Line
  -  
 Iyotetsu Gunchū Line
 -  -  -

Highway

Points of interest 
 Kubota Palm Garden

Noted people from Masaki
Reiko Kataoka, actress

References

External links

 Masaki official website 

Towns in Ehime Prefecture
Populated coastal places in Japan
Masaki, Ehime